Serez may refer to:
 Serez, Eure, a commune in the department of Eure, France
 Serres, a city in the Greek region of Macedonia